The Ontario Heritage Trust is a non-profit agency of the Ontario Ministry of Tourism and Culture. It is responsible for protecting, preserving and promoting the built, natural and cultural heritage of Canada's most populous province, Ontario.

History

It was initially known as the Archaeological and Historic Sites Board during the 1950s. It was incorporated into the Ontario Heritage Foundation in 1967 by the Ontario legislature. Its name was changed to the Ontario Heritage Trust in 2005 by an amendment to the Ontario Heritage Act. The Trust's immediate past chair is Harvey McCue.

The Trust's most recognizable work is the Provincial Plaque Program. Since 1956 (at Port Carling), it has erected over 1,200 of the now-familiar blue and gold plaques, the vast majority of which are found across Ontario, but also in the United States, France, Germany, Ireland, the United Kingdom, and the Netherlands. The Trust also owns a number of historic buildings.

The Ontario Heritage Trust Building—also known as the Birkbeck Building or the Ontario Heritage Centre—at 10 Adelaide Street East in Toronto is the headquarters of the Ontario Heritage Trust. It was used as the exterior of the "125th Precinct" in Lower Manhattan in the 2012 television series Beauty & the Beast.

Ontario Heritage Trust buildings

 Ashbridge Estate
 Barnum House
 Bethune-Thompson House
 Birkbeck Building
 Canada Southern Railway Station
 Duff Baby House
 Elgin and Winter Garden Theatres
 Enoch Turner School
 First Parliament Buildings of Upper Canada (site, adjacent to City of Toronto part of the site.)
 Fulford Place
 George Brown House
 Homewood Museum, Maitland
 Inge-Va
 Macdonell-Williamson House
 McMartin House
 Mather-Walls House
 Moose Factory Buildings National Historic Site:
 Hudson's Bay Company Staff House
 Joseph Turner House
 Ham Sackabukisham House
 William McLeod House
 Niagara Apothecary
 Parliament Interpretive Centre
 Scotsdale Farm
 Sir Harry Oakes Chateau
 Uncle Tom's Cabin Historic Site
 Wolford Chapel (in Devon, England)

References

External links

 

 
 
National trusts
Ontario Heritage Foundation
Historic preservation organizations in Canada